Marek Mach (born 30 August 2000) is a Czech footballer who currently plays as a midfielder for FK Blansko.

Club career

FC Zbrojovka Brno
He made his professional debut for Zbrojovka Brno in the season opening match against Vlašim on 19 July 2019, which ended in a draw 2:2. He was in the starting line-up, after 73 minutes he was replaced by Robert Bartolomeu.

References

External links
 Profile at FC Zbrojovka Brno official site
 Profile at FAČR official site

2000 births
Living people
Czech footballers
FC Zbrojovka Brno players
Association football midfielders
Czech National Football League players
FK Blansko players
Footballers from Brno
Czech Republic youth international footballers